Love Apartment is a 2018 Chinese romantic comedy film directed by Wei Zheng and written by Wang Yuan. The film stars Chen He, Lou Yixiao, Deng Jiajia, Sun Yizhou, Yuan Hong, and Li Jiahang. The film premiered in China on August 10, 2018. It is based on the television series iPartment.

Cast
 Chen He as Zeng Xiaoxian
 Lou Yixiao as Hu Yifei
 Deng Jiajia as Tang Youyou
 Sun Yizhou as Lü Ziqiao
 Li Jiahang as Zhang Wei
 Yuan Hong as Wu Xie
 Liu Tianzuo
 Zhao Zhi-wei as Zhang Qiling
 Zhang Shuangli as Huang Heihong
 Nanpai Sanshu as himself
 Wei Zheng as Doctor
 Yan Feng as Doctor
 Chen Xuming as Housekeeper

Production
This film was shot in Shanghai.To be more precise, it is the Wenhua Jiayuan Housing ( 文化佳园） in Shanghai ‘s Yangpu District.

Release
Love Apartment was released on August 10, 2018 in China.

The film received mainly negative reviews. Douban gave the drama 2.4 out of 10.

The film collected more than 290 million yuan on its opening day in China.

References

External links
 
 

2018 films
Chinese romantic comedy films
Films shot in Shanghai
2010s Mandarin-language films